Ynyscedwyn Ironworks is an industrial complex located in Ystradgynlais, near Swansea, Wales. Smelting was first established here in seventeenth century. In the 1820s, with the arrival of George Crane, production was expanded. Crane was the first ironmaster who successfully tried anthracite to a blast furnace in 1837.

In 1837, London bankers, Charles Price and Joseph Marryat, invested in the Ynyscedwyn Ironworks.

References

Bibliography

Industrial history of Wales
Ironworks and steelworks in Wales